Elections to Midlothian County Council were held on 10 May 1961. Midlothian was one of the four divisions that made up the historic region of Lothian in Scotland. The Local Government (Scotland) Act 1889 established Midlothian as an administrative county, governed by a County Council.

The county was divided into 39 electoral divisions, each of which returned one member. In 1961 there were contests in 16 of these.

Following the election the council was composed of 30 Labourites, eight Moderates, and one Communist.

Aggregate results

Results by division

Notes

References

1961 Scottish local elections
1961